Aspøya is an island in Ålesund Municipality in Møre og Romsdal county, Norway.  The  island is one of the islands on which the city of Ålesund is built.  The other islands are Hessa (to the west) and Nørvøya (to the east).  Aspøya is the location of the 1904 Ålesund Fire.

The small island has some residential development around Ålesund Church.  Other than that, most of the island is made up of industrial and commercial developments.  The western terminus of the European route E136 highway is on the island of Aspøya.  The  island has a population (2015) of 3,376.

See also
List of islands of Norway

References

External links
 Aspøya – øy og bydel i Ålesund, in Store norske leksikon
 http://www.norgeskart.no/#12/43885/6958206 
 Aspøy elementary school

Ålesund
Islands of Møre og Romsdal